Following is a list of justices of the Supreme Court of Hawaii.

Current justices

Past justices
From October 8, 1840, to January 15, 1848, the court was known as the Supreme Court of the Kingdom of Hawaii. 
This early Supreme Court was head by the King, the Kuhina Nui, and four other chiefs elected by the representative body to serve as Judges. The four judges of the Supreme Court were not associate justices but served that capacity as assistants to the chief justice, i.e. the King.

From January 15, 1848, to December 6, 1852, it was known as the Superior Court of the Kingdom of Hawaii.
From December 6, 1852, to January 17, 1893, it was known as the Supreme Court of the Kingdom of Hawaii.
From January 17, 1893, to July 4, 1898, it was known as the Supreme Court of the Republic of Hawaii.
From July 4, 1898, to August 21, 1959, it was known as the Supreme Court of the Territory of Hawaii.
From August 21, 1959, to the present, it is known as the Supreme Court of Hawaii.

Pre-statehood courts

Courts since statehood

 Indicates served non-consecutive terms as either an Associate Justice or Chief Justice.

References

 

Supreme Court justices
Hawaii